is the first live album by Japanese idol duo Pink Lady, released through Victor Entertainment on June 5, 1977. It was recorded live at the duo's debut concert at Tokyo Yūbin Chokin Kaikan on March 31, 1977.

The album became the duo's first No. 1 on Oricon's weekly albums chart, selling over 160,000 copies.

Track listing

Personnel
 Mie & Kei - vocals
 Jiro Inagaki and Soul Media with Strings
 Jiro Inagaki - tenor saxophone
 Tadayuki Harada - baritone saxophone
 Takaki Yoshioka - trumpet
 Takehisa Suzuki - trumpet
 Kazuo Usui - trombone
 Akira Inoue - keyboards
 Shōgo Kindaichi - bass
 Yasuhiko Tsumura - guitar
 Haruo Sōya - drums
 Mintz & Margaret - backing vocals
 Norio Maeda - arrangement

Chart positions

References

External links

 
 

1977 live albums
Pink Lady (band) live albums
Japanese-language live albums
Victor Entertainment live albums